Powiat brzeski may refer to either of two counties (powiats) in Poland:
Brzeg County, in Opole Voivodeship (south-west Poland)
Brzesko County, in Lesser Poland Voivodeship (south Poland)